The Great Conversation is the ongoing process of writers and thinkers referencing, building on, and refining the work of their predecessors. This process is characterized by writers in the Western canon making comparisons and allusions to the works of earlier writers and thinkers. As such it is a name used in the promotion of the Great Books of the Western World published by Encyclopædia Britannica Inc. in 1952. It is also the title of (i) the first volume of the first edition of this set of books, written by the educational theorist Robert Maynard Hutchins, and (ii) an accessory volume to the second edition (1990), written by the philosopher Mortimer J. Adler. 

According to Hutchins, "The tradition of the West is embodied in the Great Conversation that began in the dawn of history and that continues to the present day". Adler said, What binds the authors together in an intellectual community is the great conversation in which they are engaged. In the works that come later in the sequence of years, we find authors listening to what their predecessors have had to say about this idea or that, this topic or that. They not only harken to the thought of their predecessors, they also respond to it by commenting on it in a variety of ways.

See also
Standing on the shoulders of giants
Translatio studii

Notes

External links
 Great Conversation book discussion group

Liberal Education, essay by Robert M. Hutchins
 The Tradition of the West – chapter one of "The Great Conversation" online preserved at the Internet Archive

1952 non-fiction books
Abstraction
Concepts in aesthetics
Concepts in epistemology
History of literature
History of philosophy
Innovation
Literary concepts
Philosophical schools and traditions
Philosophy of culture
Philosophy of literature
Philosophy of mind
Sociology of knowledge
Tradition